Muwol station is a closed station in Miryang on the Gyeongbu Line in South Korea.

Defunct railway stations in South Korea